Patrice Casimir (born 4 July 1972) is a French gymnast. He competed at the 1992 Summer Olympics and the 1996 Summer Olympics.

References

1972 births
Living people
French male artistic gymnasts
Olympic gymnasts of France
Gymnasts at the 1992 Summer Olympics
Gymnasts at the 1996 Summer Olympics
People from Saint-Pierre, Réunion
20th-century French people